Charles Bouwmeester was a footballer who played for FC Basel. He played in the position as midfielder.

Football career
Between the years 1917 and 1918 Bouwmeester played a total of six games for Basel, but he did not score a goal. Four of these matches were in the Swiss Serie A and the other two matches were friendly games.

References

Sources
 Rotblau: Jahrbuch Saison 2017/2018. Publisher: FC Basel Marketing AG. 
 Die ersten 125 Jahre. Publisher: Josef Zindel im Friedrich Reinhardt Verlag, Basel. 
 Verein "Basler Fussballarchiv" Homepage

FC Basel players
Association football midfielders
Year of birth missing
Year of death missing
Swiss men's footballers